Microsoft Exchange can refer to:

 Microsoft Exchange Server, an email server software product from Microsoft
 Microsoft Exchange Client, the former companion client software for Exchange Server that was embedded into some versions of Microsoft Windows
 Microsoft Exchange Hosted Services, an email filtering system